Group F of the 2019 Africa Cup of Nations took place from 25 June to 2 July 2019. The group consisted of Benin, defending champions Cameroon, Ghana and Guinea-Bissau.

Ghana and Cameroon as the top two teams, along with Benin as one of the four best third-placed teams, advanced to the round of 16.

Teams

Notes

Standings

In the round of 16:
 The winners of Group F, Ghana, advanced to play the runners-up of Group E, Tunisia.
 The runners-up of Group F, Cameroon, advanced to play the runners-up of Group B, Cameroon.
 The third-placed team of Group F, Benin, advanced to play the winners of Group D, Morocco.

Matches

Cameroon vs Guinea-Bissau

Ghana vs Benin

Cameroon vs Ghana

Benin vs Guinea-Bissau

Benin vs Cameroon

Guinea-Bissau vs Ghana

References

External links
 

2019 Africa Cup of Nations